Robert McNeil (24 November 1890 – 21 February 1948) was a Scottish footballer who played for Hamilton Academical and Chelsea. He was a neat outside left  who dribbled well and had an accurate shot.

Career

Club
Born in Springburn, Glasgow, McNeil spent part of his childhood in Wishaw, Lanarkshire. After spells in the Junior grade where his clubs included Shettleston, he joined Hamilton Academical in December 1910 and quickly established himself, playing in the 1911 Scottish Cup Final which Accies lost to Celtic after a replay.

McNeil transferred to Chelsea from Hamilton Academical in April 1914. He scored on his competitive debut, and was a member of the Blues side that reached the 1915 FA Cup Final. He made a total of 306 appearances for Chelsea and scored a total of 32 goals.

During World War I when the English Football League was suspended but the Scottish Football League continued, McNeil returned north for several guest spells, including nearly three full seasons with Hamilton, shorter spells with Motherwell and a single match for Celtic (in the 1918 Glasgow Cup final) before returning to Chelsea. He later worked as a trainer at Hamilton. Following his death from stomach cancer, he was buried at Cambusnethan Cemetery.

International
McNeil represented the Scottish Football League XI three times in his initial spell at Hamilton, and played for both sides in the Home Scots v Anglo-Scots trial matches, but never appeared for Scotland at full international level.

Personal life
His son Willie McNeil also appeared for Hamilton Academical in the late 1930s, playing in the same position.

Honours
Hamilton Academical
Scottish Cup: Runners Up  1911

Chelsea
FA Cup: Runners Up  1915

References

Scottish footballers
Chelsea F.C. players
Hamilton Academical F.C. players
Motherwell F.C. players
Glasgow United F.C. players
1948 deaths
Scottish Junior Football Association players
Scottish Football League players
Scottish Football League representative players
English Football League players
Association football outside forwards
Footballers from Glasgow
1890 births
Hamilton Academical F.C. non-playing staff
People from Springburn
Sportspeople from Wishaw
Celtic F.C. wartime guest players
FA Cup Final players
Footballers from North Lanarkshire